The Canary Wharf Squash Classic is an annual international squash tournament for male professional players, held at the East Wintergarden in Canary Wharf, London, England.

The event was first held in 2004, when it was an invitational event involving eight of the world's leading players. The tournament continued in the same format in 2005. In 2006, the Canary Wharf Classic became a Professional Squash Association (PSA) Tour tournament, with qualifying rounds and a main draw of 16 players.

In 2004, the final was a best-of-seven-games match. In 2005, it changed to a best-of-five-games format.

Past finals

See also
 Squash in England

References

External links 
 Official Tournament website

Squash tournaments in the United Kingdom
Squash in England
Canary Wharf